Kind or KIND may refer to:

Concepts 
 Kindness, the human behaviour
 Kind, a basic unit of categorization
 Kind (type theory), a concept in logic and computer science
 Natural kind, in philosophy
 Created kind, often abbreviated to kinds, a creationist category of life forms
 In kind, for non-monetary transactions

Radio and television stations 
 KIND (AM), a radio station (1010 AM) licensed to Independence, Kansas, United States
 KIND-FM, a radio station (94.9 FM) licensed to Elk City, Kansas, United States
 KIND-LP, a low-power radio station (94.1 FM) licensed to serve Oxnard, California, United States
 KBIK, a radio station (102.9 FM) licensed to Independence, Kansas, United States that held the call sign KIND-FM from 1980 to 2010

Other uses 
 Kind (company), an American snack food manufacturer
 Kids in Need of Defense, a children's rights organization co-founded by actress Angelina Jolie
 Kind (album), a 2019 album by Stereophonics
 Kind (surname), a list of people with the surname
 Kind (horse) (foaled 2001), an Irish Thoroughbred racehorse 
 Kind Hundred, a hundred divided between Halland, Småland and Västergötland, Sweden
 Indianapolis International Airport (ICAO code:KIND), an airport Indiana, United States

See also 
 Kinda (disambiguation)